Tioga Central High School is a public comprehensive senior high school in Tioga Center, New York. It is a part of the Tioga Central School District.

School colors: Blue and Gold
Team name: Tigers
Mascot: Tiger

References

External links
 Tioga Central High School

Public high schools in New York (state)
Education in Tioga County, New York